Sahiwal is a city in Sahiwal District, Punjab, Pakistan.

Sahiwal may also refer to:

 Sahiwal Division, in Punjab, Pakistan
 Sahiwal District, in Sahiwal Division, Punjab, Pakistan
 Sahiwal Tehsil, a tehsil of Sahiwal District, Punjab, Pakistan
 Sahiwal, Sargodha, a city in Sargodha District, Punjab, Pakistan
 Sahiwal Tehsil, Sargodha, a tehsil of Sargodha District, Punjab, Pakistan
 Sahianwala, a town in Faisalabad District, Punjab, Pakistan
 Sahiwal cattle, originating from the area